Weiterstadt is a town in the Darmstadt-Dieburg district, in Hesse, Germany. It is situated directly northwest of Darmstadt.

Twin towns – sister cities

Weiterstadt is twinned with:
 Bagno a Ripoli, Italy
 Kiens, Italy
 Verneuil-sur-Seine, France

References

Darmstadt-Dieburg